Antoine DeRay Davis (born February 26, 1982) is an American stand-up comedian and actor.

Life and career
Davis was born in Chicago, Illinois. He began his career in comedy clubs. Shortly after moving to Los Angeles, he won the Comedy Central Laugh Riots Competition and appeared on the Cedric the Entertainer Tour. Known for his role as Ray the Hustle Guy in Barbershop and Barbershop 2: Back in Business, Davis has also appeared in other films, including Semi-Pro, 21 Jump Street, and How High 2. Davis' television roles and appearances have included programs such as Comedy Central's Reno 911, BET's ComicView, FOX's Empire, MTV's Wild 'n Out and Short Circuitz, FX's Snowfall, and HBO's Entourage. He hosted his first game show, Mind of a Man, on Game Show Network, and later appeared on the Oxygen reality show Living with Funny. He is also the host of the revival of Hip Hop Squares produced & narrated by Ice Cube.

The comedian also sounds on several skits on rapper Kanye West's albums The College Dropout and Late Registration, impersonating Bernie Mac in the former album's opening track "Intro", and appearing as the lead of the fictitious fraternity "Broke Phi Broke." Davis, also appeared in West's music video for "Through the Wire." Other music video appearances for Davis include Lil' Flip's "Game Over (Flip)", Chris Brown's "Yo (Excuse Me Miss),"  Three 6 Mafia's "Doe Boy Fresh", Outkast's "Roses", and Cassie's "Long Way 2 Go."

Filmography

Film

Television

References

External links
Official DeRay Davis website

American stand-up comedians
Living people
American male film actors
African-American male comedians
American male comedians
African-American game show hosts
Male actors from Chicago
African-American male actors
American male television actors
Comedians from Illinois
21st-century American comedians
1982 births
21st-century African-American people